Union Valley may refer to the following places:

Union Valley, New Jersey, an unincorporated community in Middlesex County
Union Valley, Texas, a city in Hunt County
Union Valley, Kaufman County, Texas, an unincorporated community
Union Valley Elementary School, a public school in Erial, New Jersey
Union Valley Reservoir, a reservoir in El Dorado County, California